Sangya Balya (Kannada: ಸಂಗ್ಯಾ ಬಾಳ್ಯಾ) is a 1992 Indian Kannada film directed by Sundar Krishna Urs. The film's story is based on folktale of same name, written more than hundred years earlier. The music was scored by Vijaya Bhaskar. The film was shot in and around Turmari and Hunashikatti villages in Bailhongal Taluk, Belagavi District.

Plot

Cast
 Ramakrishna as Sangya
 Vijay Kashi as Balya
 Avinash as Veeranna Setty
 Bharati Patil as Ganga
 Umashree as Paravva
 N Basavaraj
 Haveri Babanna
 D Basavaraj
 Abhishek

Soundtrack 
"Chiguru Meeseya Theedi" - Manjula Gururaj
"Haniki Nodutha" - Manjula Gururaj, Yashavanth Halibandi
"Erali Notadantha Henna" - Vishnu
"Genethanada Gammatthu" - Gururaj Hosakote
"Madhana Anthaara" - B. R. Chaya
"Nodidu Baalina Bandiyu" - B. R. Chaya

References

External links
 Sangya Balya on Youtube

1992 films
1990s Kannada-language films
Films scored by Vijaya Bhaskar